Urlacher is a surname. Notable people with the surname include:

Brian Urlacher (born 1978), American football player
Casey Urlacher (born 1979), American football player, brother of Brian